Komařice is a municipality and village in České Budějovice District in the South Bohemian Region of the Czech Republic. It has about 400 inhabitants.

Administrative parts
Villages of Pašinovice, Sedlo and Stradov are administrative parts of Komařice.

History
The first written mention of Komařice is from 1346.

References

Villages in České Budějovice District